The agene process is a former process for bleaching flour with agene (nitrogen trichloride). The practice was discontinued in 1949 once it became known that agene treated flour caused severe and widespread neurological disorders in humans and dogs.

References

Neurological disorders